Q300 may refer to:

 Q300, an airplane model of the Bombardier Dash 8
 The 30th Avenue School, officially P.S. 300Q New York City Department of Education public school, located in Astoria, Queens, also known as Q300, one of five Gifted and Talented city-wide schools